The River Moyola or Moyola River stretches for approximately 27 miles from the Sperrin Mountains to Lough Neagh. The Moyola starts a small river (3-5 metres; 10' to 16') for the first few miles of its length and proceeds to expand to a medium-sized river (5-20 metres; 16' to 65') and then to a large river (20 metres +; 65' plus) for its last couple of miles before Lough Neagh. In ancient times, the River Moyola was known as the 'Bior', and served as the border between the Airgiallan kingdoms of Fir Li and Ui Tuirtri.

According to Deirdre and Laurence Flanagan in their book, Irish Place Names, the River Moyola derives its name from Magh nÉola, meaning Éolas Plain.

Hydrology
The flow or discharge of the river is measured near to its mouth in Lough Neagh.

The catchment has a varied geology including limestone, schist, shale and basalt with outcrops of chalk. Overlying this solid geology are superficial deposits of glacial till, plus sand and aggregates. Land use is primarily grassland, with areas of bog and heathland, but includes the towns of Magherafelt and Maghera.

Mentions in literature

The river is mentioned frequently in the poetry of Seamus Heaney, such as  Gifts of Rain and A New Song, Whitby-sur-Moyola and Moyulla. Critic Daniel Tobin suggests that for Heaney his "childhood river, Moyola, is not unlike Wordsworth's Derwent."

References

Rivers of County Londonderry